Shamsabad (also Romanized as Shamsābād; also known as Shamsābād-e Gā'īnī Hā) is a village in Qanavat Rural District, in the Central District of Qom County, Qom Province, Iran. At the 2006 census, its population was 625, in 137 families.

References 

Populated places in Qom Province